Dave Engellenner (30 March 1919 – 8 October 2014) was an  Australian rules footballer who played with South Melbourne in the Victorian Football League (VFL).

Notes

External links 

1919 births
2014 deaths
Australian rules footballers from Victoria (Australia)
Sydney Swans players